Strumigenys lichiaensis is a species of yellow ant up to 2.8 mm in length. It is endemic to Taiwan.

This species can be distinguished from all Taiwanese congeners except Strumigenys liukueiensis by the numerous stout hairs on the dorsal surface of the mesosoma. It can be separated from S. liukueiensis by its considerably smaller size (workers only up to 2.2 mm in length).

References

Myrmicinae
Insects described in 1996
Endemic fauna of Taiwan
Insects of Taiwan
Hymenoptera of Asia